Shift Drinks was a cocktail bar in Portland, Oregon. The bar opened in 2015 and closed in 2020, during the COVID-19 pandemic.

Description
The cocktail bar Shift Drinks had a wine list with approximately 100 bottles. The bar's interior was described as "spacious and minimalist". Willamette Week Matthew Korfhage said the "monochromatic, airy space is an exercise in minimalism and knowing ironies, down to the giant black-and-white photo of drunken Batman, or another of a beautiful woman having a drink thrown in her face".

History

The bar opened in the Terminal Sales Building on May 18, 2015. Anthony Garcia was a co-owner, along with his wife Anne Garcia and Alise Moffat, a chef and bartender, respectively.

For approximately 11 months of 2015–2016, the upstairs area hosted the restaurant Nomad.PDX. In May 2016, Shift branded the area as Makeshift Room for hosting private events. The bar began offering free dinners on Sundays in 2016, followed by all-day happy hour in 2017. Shift closed permanently in mid 2020, during the COVID-19 pandemic, and was replaced by the bar and restaurant City Bridge & Tunnel.

Reception
In 2016, Willamette Week Sami Gaston called Shift "a bartender's bar". In 2019, the newspaper said, "There may be times when a rooftop view is worth an overpriced cocktail. Shift Drinks is just the opposite. Come here if you need a quality drink and a simple space that leans more toward the contemplative than the rowdy. The music is good, the menu caters to modest budgeted connoisseurs and rookies looking for "something sparkly" alike, and the snack menu easily makes a satisfying dinner." In 2020, the Portland Mercury Suzette Smith described the Alise Moffatt's Physically Forgotten as "a standard and favorite".

Following its closure, Eater Portland Brooke Jackson-Glidden called Shift "beloved" and "iconic". The website's Alex Frane mentioned the bar in a list of the "Saddest Portland Restaurant Closures of 2020".

See also
 Impact of the COVID-19 pandemic on the restaurant industry in the United States
 List of defunct restaurants of the United States

References

External links

 
 Shift Drinks at Thrillist
 Shift Drinks at Zomato

2015 establishments in Oregon
2020 disestablishments in Oregon
Defunct drinking establishments in Oregon
Defunct restaurants in Portland, Oregon
Restaurants disestablished during the COVID-19 pandemic
Restaurants disestablished in 2020
Restaurants established in 2015
Southwest Portland, Oregon